Kevin Kruschke (born 19 August 1991) is a German footballer who plays for SV Rödinghausen.

External links 
 

1991 births
Living people
German footballers
Association football midfielders
3. Liga players
Regionalliga players
Berliner AK 07 players
1. FC Magdeburg players